The Song of the Sea Shell is a 1914 American silent drama short directed by Henry Otto, starring Edith Borella, Charlotte Burton, George Field, and Ed Coxen.

References

External links

1914 films
1914 drama films
Silent American drama films
American silent short films
American black-and-white films
1914 short films
Films directed by Henry Otto
1910s American films